Bangladesh–Ireland relations refer to the bilateral relations between Bangladesh and the Republic of Ireland.

Both Bangladesh and Ireland were part of the British Empire, but Bangladesh is a republic in the Commonwealth of Nations, whereas, Ireland became a republic outside the Commonwealth of Nations on 18 April 1949 under the terms of the Republic of Ireland Act 1948. Relations between the two countries were established in early 1972.

Economic cooperation 

Bangladesh and Ireland have shown mutual interest to expand the bilateral economic activities between the two countries and both the countries have recognized necessary measures to expand the existing trade and investment. Many Irish firms have expressed their interests to invest in Bangladesh in the promising sectors.

In 2009, an Irish trade delegation headed by former Irish Minister for investment and coordination Conor Lenihan visited Bangladesh to explore potential ways for increasing bilateral trade and investment. Ireland has shown interest to recruit skilled IT professionals from Bangladesh.

Migrants

There is small Bangladeshi migrant group in Ireland. 99 Bangladeshis applied for asylum in Ireland in 2014 and 2015 the number rose to 231. Some of the Bangladeshis are illegal immigrants. Bangladesh-born Maksuda Akter won Ms. Ireland Beauty Pageant 2014.

Diplomatic representation

Ireland and Bangladesh do not have resident Ambassadors in each other's countries. Ireland's Ambassador to India is also cross-accredited to Bangladesh as well. Bangladesh's High Commissioner to the United Kingdom is also cross-accredited as Bangladesh's Ambassador to Ireland. In 2019 the Bangladeshi ambassador invited the Irish government to open an embassy in Dhaka.

References 

 
Bangladesh and the Commonwealth of Nations
Ireland
Bilateral relations of Ireland
Ireland and the Commonwealth of Nations